The golden ratio is a number, approximately 1.618. Golden ratio may also refer to:
The Golden Ratio (album), 2010 pop music album by Ace of Base
Golden Ratio (song), 2021 electronic music track by Hayden Thorpe

See also